Haywood Smith is an American author. She lives in Georgia.

Writing career
Smith's first book, Shadows in Velvet, won the Romantic Times 1996 Award for First Historical Romance. Her first several books were historical romances, in settings including 17th Century France and England and Medieval Scotland. With Queen Bee of Mimosa Branch, she moved into writing women's fiction about women 50 years old and older, set in the Southern United States.

Smith's books The Red Hat Club and Queen Bee of Mimosa Branch appeared on The New York Times Best Seller List.

Books
Shadows In Velvet, St. Martin's Press, 1996
Secrets In Satin, St. Martin's Press, 1997 
Damask Rose, St. Martin's Press, 1998
Dangerous Gifts, St. Martin's Press, 1999 
Highland Princess, St. Martin's Press, 2000	
Border Lord, St. Martin's Press, 2001 
Queen Bee of Mimosa Branch, St. Martin's Press, 2002 
The Red Hat Club, St. Martin's Press, 2003 
The Red Hat Club Rides Again, St. Martin's Press, 2005 
Wedding Belles, St. Martin's Press, 2008
The Twelve Sacred Traditions of Magnificent Mothers-In-Law, Belle Books, 2009 
Ladies of the Lake, St. Martin's Press, 2009 
Waking Up in Dixie, St. Martin's Press, 2010 
Wife-in-Law, St. Martin's Press, 2011 
Out of Warranty, St. Martin's Press, 2013 
Queen Bee Goes Home Again, St. Martin's Press, 2014

External links
Haywood Smith's official website

References

American women novelists
Living people
American historical novelists
American romantic fiction novelists
Women romantic fiction writers
20th-century American novelists
20th-century American women writers
21st-century American novelists
21st-century American women writers
Novelists from Georgia (U.S. state)
Women historical novelists
Year of birth missing (living people)